The 2010 World Karate Championships are the 20th edition of the World Karate Championships, and were held in Belgrade, Serbia from October 27 to October 31, 2010.

Medalists

Men

Women

Medal table

Participating nations 
875 athletes from 88 nations competed.

 (4)
 (17)
 (1)
 (10)
 (3)
 (5)
 (11)
 (11)
 (12)
 (9)
 (1)
 (14)
 (6)
 (13)
 (14)
 (12)
 (10)
 (12)
 (8)
 (4)
 (25)
 (3)
 (9)
 (6)
 (20)
 (10)
 (5)
 (6)
 (25)
 (2)
 (19)
 (12)
 (2)
 (18)
 (10)
 (17)
 (13)
 (16)
 (2)
 (19)
 (20)
 (6)
 (13)
 (13)
 (3)
 (5)
 (3)
 (8)
 (22)
 (8)
 (13)
 (1)
 (21)
 (11)
 (2)
 (13)
 (2)
 (5)
 (1)
 (6)
 (4)
 (4)
 (2)
 (3)
 (6)
 (22)
 (1)
 (10)
 (9)
 (11)
 (23)
 (14)
 (13)
 (17)
 (10)
 (20)
 (8)
 (11)
 (8)
 (10)
 (20)
 (5)
 (8)
 (14)
 (8)
 (12)
 (4)
 (6)

References

 Results
 Results

External links
 World Karate Federation

World Championships
World Karate Championships
World Karate Championships
Karate Championships
Karate competitions in Serbia
2010s in Belgrade
October 2010 sports events in Europe